Beuys is a 2017 German documentary film directed by Andres Veiel about the German artist Joseph Beuys. It was selected to compete for the Golden Bear in the main competition section of the 67th Berlin International Film Festival.

Noting that the film emphasizes the "social conscience" behind Beuys's art, Glenn Kenny, writing for The New York Times, called it "an exhilarating portrait of a unique truth-teller".

References

External links
 

2017 films
2017 documentary films
German documentary films
2010s German-language films
Films directed by Andres Veiel
Joseph Beuys
2010s German films